Charles Gilbert Chaddock (November 14, 1861 – July 20, 1936) was an American neurologist, psychiatrist, and translator. He is remembered for describing the Chaddock reflex and is credited with the coinage of the terms bisexuality, heterosexuality, and homosexuality in the English language.

Biography 
Charles Gilbert Chaddock was born on November 14, 1861 in Jonesville, Michigan. In 1885, he graduated from the University of Michigan College of Medicine and Surgery, then worked at the North Michigan Asylum in Traverse City as a staff physician. From 1889 to 1890, Chaddock studied in Munich. On his return, he again worked at the Asylum, before, in 1892, becoming Professor of Nervous and Mental Diseases at Marion-Sims College, which later became part of the Saint Louis University School of Medicine. He married Adelaide Gowans MacPherson in 1890. Baddock returned to Europe in 1897, spending most of the time as assistant to Joseph Babinski. On his return to the United States in 1899, Chaddock introduced American physicians to Babinski's sign, later publishing a translation of Babinski's work. Chaddock introduced his eponymous reflex in 1911, calling it the External Malleolar sign. He also described an analogous sign in the upper limb. Chaddock died on July 20, 1936. He was interred by a Protestant reverend in Oakwood Cemetery, Allegan, Michigan.

Legacy 
Chaddock is credited with the first use of the words heterosexuality and homosexuality in the English language, as well as the first use of the word bisexuality in its sense of being sexually attracted to both women and men, in his translation of Richard von Krafft-Ebing's Psychopathia Sexualis in 1892. Prior to Von Krafft-Ebing's new use of the term, "bisexual" was usually used to refer to hermaphroditic plants, that is having both male and female reproductive structures, or to refer to mixed-sex situations such as schools.

References

External links

 
 
 Works by or about Charles Gilbert Chaddock at the Online Books Page
 

1861 births
1936 deaths
19th-century American physicians
19th-century American translators
20th-century American physicians
20th-century American translators
American neurologists
American psychiatrists
People from Jonesville, Michigan
Saint Louis University faculty
University of Michigan Medical School alumni